Doomsday Sun is an EP by The Black League, released in 2001 by Spinefarm Records.

Track listing
"1% - Doomsday... Now!" – 4:03 
"City Of Refuge" – 4:39
"The Sunday Song (aka The Everlasting Pt. III)" – 3:24 
"Many A Good Men" – 2:52
"Black Java" – 3:38
"Sanguinary Blues" – 5:37

All lyrics by Taneli Jarva except City Of Refuge by Nick Cave.

Personnel
Taneli Jarva — vocals & additional instruments
Sir Luttinen — drums and percussion
Maike Valanne — guitars & backing vocals
Alexi Ranta — guitars
Florida — bass guitar
Mika Pohjola — keyboards (tracks 4,5)
Läjä Äijälä - laughing (track 6)
The 3-Time Losers Bull Choir - backing vocals (tracks 1,2)

The Black League albums
2001 EPs